Nymphaea colorata is a water lily that is native to tropical East Africa. It was first described by A. Peter in 1928.

Description
Nymphaea colorata is day blooming and nonviviparous plant. Its flower has dark blue to violet color and consists of 4-5 sepals and 13-15 petals. The shape is cup-like with a diameter of 11–14 cm. The round leaves are green on the top and have bluish-violet underside. Their size is about 20–23 cm and their spread is 0.9 to 1.8m

Usage
Nymphaea colorata is used as an ornamental flower and has the advantage of having a long flowering period. In addition it even keeps flowering when the temperatures drops to 18 C. It has been used to create several cultivars and hybrids.

References

 Perry D. Slocum: Waterlilies and Lotuses. Timber Press 2005,  (restricted online version at Google Books)
 Fact sheet for the Nymphaea colorata

Freshwater plants
colorata
Plants described in 1928